Steve Kelley may refer to:

Steve Kelley (politician) (born 1953), Minnesota politician
Steve Kelley (cartoonist), editorial cartoonist, comic strip creator, comedian, and writer
Steve Kelley, co-host of Canadian reality TV show Junk Brothers

See also
Steve Kelly (disambiguation)
Kelley (disambiguation)